The Osmeriformes  are an order of ray-finned fish that includes the true or freshwater smelts and allies, such as the galaxiids and noodlefishes; they are also collectively called osmeriforms. They belong to the teleost superorder Protacanthopterygii, which also includes pike and salmon, among others. The order's name means "smelt-shaped", from Osmerus (the type genus) + the standard fish order suffix "-formes". It ultimately derives from Ancient Greek osmé (ὀσμή, "pungent smell") + Latin forma ("external form"), the former in reference to the characteristic aroma of the flesh of Osmerus.

In the classification used here, the order Osmeriformes contains two suborders, six families, some 20 genera, and about 93 species. Other authors choose a slightly different arrangement, but whether treated as suborders (Galaxoidei and Osmeroidei) or superfamilies (Galaxoidea and Osmeroidea), the division in two lineages is generally maintained.

The "marine" smelts and allies (e.g. the odd-looking barreleyes) were formerly included here as suborder Argentinoidei; they are now usually considered more distantly related than it was believed and treated as order Argentiniformes. When the marine smelts were included here, the subdivisions of the Osmeriformes were down-ranked by one.

Description and ecology
Osmeriformes are small to mid-sized slender fish. Their maxilla is usually included in the mouth's gape, and most of them have an adipose fin as is often found in the Protacanthopterygii. Their [pterosphenoid] usually has a ventral flange, and the vomer has a short posterior shaft. They have reduced or even missing articular and mesopterygoid teeth, and the basisphenoid and orbitosphenoid bones are entirely absent. Their scales lack radii.

Despite the term "freshwater smelts", the members of the Osmeriformes are generally marine, or amphidromous or anadromous migrants. Even the sedentary freshwater species in this family are usually tolerant of considerable changes in salinity. Almost all osmeriforms spawn in fresh water, thus the marine species are generally anadromous. They are found in temperate oceans worldwide and in temperate freshwater of the Holarctic and around the South Pacific region; only a handful of species occur in tropical waters. The eggs are surrounded by an adhesive membrane.

Systematics
With the Argentiniformes separated as a distinct order, the remaining Osmeriformes appear to be a monophyletic group. Their placement in the Protacanthopterygii is not entirely clear, but may well be the closest living relatives of the Esociformes (pikes and mudminnows). Others consider them closer to the Salmoniformes (trouts, salmons and relatives).  A closer relationship to the Stomiiformes than previously assumed is supported by anatomical and DNA sequence data. But this can be simply taken to suggest that the superorder "Stenopterygii" ought to be included in the Protacanthopterygii, rather than a particularly close relationship between the two orders.

The classification of the Osmeriformes as approached here is:
 Family †Spaniodontidae Jordan 1905
 Suborder Retropinnoidei
 Family Retropinnidae (Australian-New Zealand smelts and graylings)
 Suborder Osmeroidei
 Family Osmeridae (freshwater smelts, typical smelts)
 Family Plecoglossidae (Ayu)
 Family Salangidae (noodlefishes, "icefish")

A possible fossil osmeriform is Spaniodon, a piscivore from Late Cretaceous seas. The group originated probably somewhat earlier, but a Cretaceous age maybe about 110 million years ago or so is likely. The  families Galaxiidae and Lepidogalaxiidae were at one time placed together with Retropinnidae in the sub order Galaxoidei, however with new molecular studies they have been elevated to the ordinal level.

Timeline of genera

References

Further reading

 

 
Articles which contain graphical timelines
Ray-finned fish orders